Haicheng County was a historic county in South China, dating to the Ming Dynasty. During the late Ming Dynasty, Haicheng was one of China's most important ports, earning the moniker "Little Suzhou-Hangzhou", a reference to the historically prominent trading centers of Hangzhou and Suzhou.

History

Haicheng was elevated to county status on 17 January 1567 during the Ming Dynasty, and was the site of Yuegang (Moon Harbor), a major seaport handling the majority of maritime trade with Southeast Asia. Haicheng County was merged with Longxi County in 1960 to form the modern-day Longhai City in Fujian Province. For most of its history, the administrative center of the county was in Shima.

References

Former counties of China
County-level divisions of Fujian
History of Fujian
1960s disestablishments in China